Éleu-dit-Leauwette is a commune in the Pas-de-Calais department in the Hauts-de-France region of France.

Geography

History
Completely destroyed during World War I and awarded the Croix de Guerre in 1920, this town was once home to many coal miners but is now a light industrial area and bedroom community.

Population

Places of interest

 The church of St.Pierre, rebuilt after the First World War.
 Parts of the walls of an old castle.
 The war memorial.

See also
Communes of the Pas-de-Calais department

References

External links

Official town website 
The community of communes website 

Eleuditleauwette
Artois